The Child of Destiny is a lost 1916 silent film drama directed by William Nigh and starring Irene Fenwick. It was produced and distributed by Metro Pictures.

Cast
Irene Fenwick - Alita
Madame Ganna Walska - Constance (aka Ganna Walska)
Robert Elliott - Bob Stange
Roy Applegate - Judge Gates
Roy Clair - Weird Willie
William Yearance - Professor Jaeger
Martin Faust - Oswald, His Son (*Martin J. Faust)
William B. Davidson - Calvin Baker (*as William Davidson)
R. A. Breese - Putnam
Elizabeth Le Roy - Mrs. Putnam

References

External links

1916 films
American silent feature films
Films directed by William Nigh
Lost American films
1916 drama films
American black-and-white films
Silent American drama films
Metro Pictures films
1916 lost films
Lost drama films
1910s American films